HDMS Bellona was a frigate of the Royal Danish Navy, which she served from 1835 to 1862.

Construction and design

Bellona was built at Nyholm to a design by Andreas  Schifter.She was one of four frigates in the same class. The others were HDMS Freya (1824-1853), 

She displaced 705 læster. Her complement was 404 men. She was equipped with 46 18 pound cannons.
A model of this ship, placed in 1840, can be seen in St. Jørgensbjerg Kirke in Roskilde

Career

Mediterranean Sea

HDMS Bellona was launched on 15 September 1830. Commissioned on 1 May 1835, she completed an expedition to the Mediterranean Sea from Copenhagen between 1 May and 5 September 1835. She was under the command of captain Louis de Coninck and brought back some of Bertel Thorvaldsen's works.

Voyage to South America 

From 24 August 1840 to 21 August 1841, under command of captain Christian Wulff, she completed a voyage to South America. The primary purpose of this voyage was the establishment of trade agreements with the South American states, but also to establish contact to emigrated Danish citizens and in general fly the Danish flag in the new world. Scientific expeditions were also in fashion (not the least the recently completed voyage of HMS Beagle 1831-36 with Charles Darwin on board) and the Danish King Christian VIII had a keen interest for natural sciences. Thus on board Bellona was the 41 year old naturalist Henrik Nikolai Krøyer. Almost nothing is known from direct sources about Krøyer's work on Bellona, but indirectly from his later scientific publications it is evident that he collected a wealth of animals, in particular crustaceans.

First Schleswig War and later years 

In 1847, from 15 May to 18 August, she was commissioned to pick up a load of cereal products in St. Petersburg.

She was then equipped for service in the First Schleswig War. On 10 August 1849, she ran aground in the Elbe whilst blockading Hamburg. The blockade was due to be lifted the next day.

Bellona was in use as a naval training ship from 16 May to 25 September 1858. She was under command of captain R. F. E. Dirkinck-Holmfeld.

Fate
She was decommissioned from the Navy on 25 June 1862. She was for a while used as a storage facility at Høruphav in 1864 before being broken up in 1868.

References

External links

 Fregatten Belonas togt til Sydamerika 1840-41
 Den danske besejling af Sydamerika i det 19. århundrede
 Source
Danish Naval Museum website - then click Skibregister, then B, and the Bellona record is on page 2.  - - the ship's record, which gives further references to Topsøe-Jensen for the naval officers who saw service in this ship
Marcussen Website 
T. A. Topsøe-Jensen og Emil Marquard (1935) “Officerer i den dansk-norske Søetat 1660-1814 og den danske Søetat 1814-1932“. Two volumes Volume 1 and Volume 2
Orlogbasen  - the database for all ships in the Danish Navy.
 [https://www.henrikpontoppidan.dk/text/hps/nyhedsbrev/nyhed58.html Source}

Frigates of the Royal Danish Navy
Sailing ships of Denmark
Ships built in Copenhagen
1830 ships
Maritime incidents in August 1849
Research vessels of Denmark
Ships designed by Andreas Schifter